Korean (South Korean: , hangugeo; North Korean: , chosŏnmal) is the native language for about 80 million people, mostly of Korean descent. It is the official and national language of both North Korea and South Korea (geographically Korea), but over the past  years of political division, the two Koreas have developed some noticeable vocabulary differences. Beyond Korea, the language is recognised as a minority language in parts of China, namely Jilin Province, and specifically Yanbian Prefecture and Changbai County. The language has a few extinct relatives which—along with the Jeju language (Jejuan) of Jeju Island and Korean itself—form the compact Koreanic language family. Even so, Jejuan and Korean are not mutually intelligible with each other. The linguistic homeland of Korean is suggested to be somewhere in contemporary Northeast China. The hierarchy of the society from which the language originates deeply influences the language, leading to a system of speech levels and honorifics indicative of the formality of any given situation.

Modern Korean is written in the Korean script ( in South Korea,  in North Korea), a system developed during the 15th century for that purpose, although it did not become the primary script until the 20th century. The script uses 24 basic letters (jamo) and 27 complex letters formed from the basic ones. When first recorded in historical texts, Korean was only a spoken language; all written records were maintained in Classical Chinese, which, even when spoken, is not intelligible to someone who speaks only Korean. Later, Chinese characters adapted to the Korean language, Hanja, were used to write the language for most of Korea's history and are still used to a limited extent in South Korea, most prominently in the humanities and the study of historical texts.

Since the turn of the 21st century, aspects of Korean culture have spread to other countries through globalization and cultural exports. As such, interest in Korean language acquisition (as a foreign language) is also generated by longstanding alliances, military involvement, and diplomacy, such as between South Korea–United States and China–North Korea since the end of World War II and the Korean War. Along with other languages such as Chinese and Arabic, Korean is ranked at the top difficulty level for English speakers by the United States Department of Defense.

History

Modern Korean descends from Middle Korean, which in turn descends from Old Korean, which descends from the Proto-Koreanic language which is generally suggested to have its linguistic homeland. Whitman (2012) suggests that the proto-Koreans, already present in northern Korea, expanded into the southern part of the Korean Peninsula at around 300 BC and coexisted with the descendants of the Japonic Mumun cultivators (or assimilated them). Both had influence on each other and a later founder effect diminished the internal variety of both language families.

Since the Korean War, through 70 years of separation, North–South differences have developed in standard Korean, including variations in pronunciation and vocabulary chosen, but these minor differences can be found in any of the Korean dialects, which are still largely mutually intelligible.

Writing systems 

Chinese characters arrived in Korea (see Sino-Xenic pronunciations for further information) together with Buddhism during the Proto-Three Kingdoms era in the 1st century BC. They were adapted for Korean and became known as Hanja, and remained as the main script for writing Korean for over a millennium alongside various phonetic scripts that were later invented such as Idu, Gugyeol and Hyangchal. Mainly privileged elites were educated to read and write in Hanja. However, most of the population was illiterate.

In the 15th century, King Sejong the Great personally developed an alphabetic featural writing system known today as Hangul. He felt that Hanja was inadequate to write Korean and that caused its very restricted use; Hangul was designed to either aid in reading Hanja or to replace Hanja entirely. Introduced in the document , it was called  (colloquial script) and quickly spread nationwide to increase literacy in Korea. Consequently, official documents were always written in Hanja during the Joseon era. Since few people could understand Hanja, Korean kings sometimes released public notices entirely written in Hangul as early as the 16th century for all Korean classes, including uneducated peasants and slaves. By the 17th century, the elite class of  had exchanged Hangul letters with slaves, which suggests a high literacy rate of Hangul during the Joseon era.

Today, Hanja is largely unused in everyday life because of its inconvenience, but it is still important for historical and linguistic studies. Neither South Korea nor North Korea opposes the learning of Hanja, but they are not officially used in North Korea anymore, and their usage in South Korea is mainly reserved for specific circumstances like newspapers, scholarly papers, and disambiguation.

Names
The Korean names for the language are based on the names for Korea used in both South Korea and North Korea. The English word "Korean" is derived from Goryeo, which is thought to be the first Korean dynasty known to Western nations. Some older English sources also use the spelling "Corea" to refer to the nation, and its inflected form for the language, culture and people, "Korea" becoming more popular in the late 1800s.

This name is based on the same Han characters ( "nation" + "language") that are also used in Taiwan and Japan to refer to their respective national languages.

In North Korea and China, the language is most often called , or more formally, . This is taken from the North Korean name for Korea (Joseon), a name retained from the Joseon dynasty until the proclamation of the Korean Empire, which in turn was annexed by the Empire of Japan.

In mainland China, following the establishment of diplomatic relations with South Korea in 1992, the term  or the short form Cháoyǔ has normally been used to refer to the standard language of North Korea and Yanbian, whereas Hánguóyǔ or the short form Hányǔ is used to refer to the standard language of South Korea.

Classification

Korean is a member of the Koreanic family along with the Jeju language. Some linguists have included it in the Altaic family, but the core Altaic proposal itself has lost most of its prior support. The Khitan language has several vocabulary items similar to Korean that are not found in other Mongolian or Tungusic languages, suggesting a Korean influence on Khitan.

The obsolete hypothesis that Korean could be related to Japanese has had some supporters due to some overlap in vocabulary and similar grammatical features that have been elaborated upon by such researchers as Samuel E. Martin and Roy Andrew Miller. Sergei Anatolyevich Starostin (1991) found about 25% of potential cognates in the Japanese–Korean 100-word Swadesh list.
Some linguists concerned with the issue between Japanese and Korean, including Alexander Vovin, have argued that the indicated similarities are not due to any genetic relationship, but rather to a sprachbund effect and heavy borrowing, especially from Ancient Korean into Western Old Japanese. A good example might be Middle Korean sàm and Japanese asá, meaning "hemp". This word seems to be a cognate, but although it is well attested in Western Old Japanese and Northern Ryukyuan languages, in Eastern Old Japanese it only occurs in compounds, and it is only present in three dialects of the Southern Ryukyuan language group. Also, the doublet wo meaning "hemp" is attested in Western Old Japanese and Southern Ryukyuan languages. It is thus plausible to assume a borrowed term. (See Classification of the Japonic languages or Comparison of Japanese and Korean for further details on a possible relationship.)

Hudson & Robbeets (2020) suggested that there are traces of a pre-Nivkh substratum in Korean. According to the hypothesis, ancestral varieties of Nivkh (also known as Amuric) were once distributed on the Korean peninsula before the arrival of Koreanic speakers.

Phonology

]
Korean syllable structure is (C)(G)V(C), consisting of an optional onset consonant, glide  and final coda  surrounding a core vowel.

Consonants

Assimilation and allophony
The IPA symbol  (a subscript double straight quotation mark, shown here with a placeholder circle) is used to denote the Tensed consonants . Its official use in the Extensions to the IPA is for 'strong' articulation, but is used in the literature for faucalized voice. The Korean consonants also have elements of stiff voice, but it is not yet known how typical this is of faucalized consonants. They are produced with a partially constricted glottis and additional subglottal pressure in addition to tense vocal tract walls, laryngeal lowering, or other expansion of the larynx.

This occurs with the tense fricative and all the affricates as well.

 become voiced  between voiced sounds.

 frequently denasalize at the beginnings of words.

Note that a written syllable-final '', when followed by a vowel or a glide (i.e., when the next character starts with ''), migrates to the next syllable and thus becomes .

Traditionally,  was disallowed at the beginning of a word. It disappeared before , and otherwise became . The traditional prohibition of word-initial  became a morphological rule called "initial law" in South Korea, which pertains to Sino-Korean vocabulary. Such words retain their word-initial  in North Korea.

All obstruents (plosives, affricates, fricatives) at the end of a word are pronounced with no audible release, .

Plosive sounds  become nasals  before nasal sounds.

Hangul spelling does not reflect these assimilatory pronunciation rules, but rather maintains the underlying, partly historical morphology. Given this, it is sometimes hard to tell which actual phonemes are present in a certain word.

One difference between the pronunciation standards of North and South Korea is the treatment of initial , and initial . For example,
 "labor" – north: rodong, south: nodong
 "history" – north: ryeoksa, south: yeoksa
 "female" – north: nyeoja, south: yeoja

Vowels

  is closer to a near-open central vowel, though  is still used for tradition.

Morphophonemics

Grammatical morphemes may change shape depending on the preceding sounds. Examples include -eun/-neun and -i/-ga.

Sometimes sounds may be inserted instead. Examples include -eul/-reul, -euro/-ro, -eseo/-seo, -ideunji/-deunji and -iya/-ya.

 However, -euro/-ro is somewhat irregular, since it will behave differently after a ㄹ (rieul consonant).

Some verbs may also change shape morphophonemically.

Grammar

Korean is an agglutinative language. The Korean language is traditionally considered to have nine parts of speech. Modifiers generally precede the modified words, and in the case of verb modifiers, can be serially appended. The sentence structure or basic form of a Korean sentence is subject–object–verb (SOV), but the verb is the only required and immovable element and word order is highly flexible, as in many other agglutinative languages.

The relationship between a speaker/writer and their subject and audience is paramount in Korean grammar. The relationship between the speaker/writer and subject referent is reflected in honorifics, whereas that between speaker/writer and audience is reflected in speech level.

Honorifics

When talking about someone superior in status, a speaker or writer usually uses special nouns or verb endings to indicate the subject's superiority. Generally, someone is superior in status if they are an older relative, a stranger of roughly equal or greater age, or an employer, teacher, customer, or the like. Someone is equal or inferior in status if they are a younger stranger, student, employee, or the like. Nowadays, there are special endings which can be used on declarative, interrogative, and imperative sentences, and both honorific or normal sentences.

Honorifics in traditional Korea were strictly hierarchical. The caste and estate systems possessed patterns and usages much more complex and stratified than those used today. The intricate structure of the Korean honorific system flourished in traditional culture and society. Honorifics in contemporary Korea are now used for people who are psychologically distant. Honorifics are also used for people who are superior in status. For example, older people, teachers, and employers.

Speech levels

There are seven verb paradigms or speech levels in Korean, and each level has its own unique set of verb endings which are used to indicate the level of formality of a situation. Unlike honorifics—which are used to show respect towards the referent (the person spoken of)—speech levels are used to show respect towards a speaker's or writer's audience (the person spoken to). The names of the seven levels are derived from the non-honorific imperative form of the verb  (hada, "do") in each level, plus the suffix  ("che",), which means "style".

The three levels with high politeness (very formally polite, formally polite, casually polite) are generally grouped together as jondaenmal, whereas the two levels with low politeness (formally impolite, casually impolite) are banmal in Korean. The remaining two levels (neutral formality with neutral politeness, high formality with neutral politeness) are neither polite nor impolite.

Nowadays, younger-generation speakers no longer feel obligated to lower their usual regard toward the referent. It is common to see younger people talk to their older relatives with banmal. This is not out of disrespect, but instead it shows the intimacy and the closeness of the relationship between the two speakers. Transformations in social structures and attitudes in today's rapidly changing society have brought about change in the way people speak.

Gender
In general, Korean lacks grammatical gender. As one of the few exceptions, the third-person singular pronoun has two different forms: 그 geu (male) and 그녀 geu-nyeo (female). Before 그녀 was invented in need of translating 'she' into Korean, 그 was the only third-person singular pronoun and had no grammatical gender. Its origin causes 그녀 never to be used in spoken Korean but appearing only in writing.

To have a more complete understanding of the intricacies of gender in Korean, three models of language and gender that have been proposed: the deficit model, the dominance model, and the cultural difference model. In the deficit model, male speech is seen as the default, and any form of speech that diverges from that norm (female speech) is seen as lesser than. The dominance model sees women as lacking in power due to living within a patriarchal society. The cultural difference model proposes that the difference in upbringing between men and women can explain the differences in their speech patterns. It is important to look at the models to better understand the misogynistic conditions that shaped the ways that men and women use the language. Korean's lack of grammatical gender makes it different from most European languages. Rather, gendered differences in Korean can be observed through formality, intonation, word choice, etc.

However, one can still find stronger contrasts between genders within Korean speech. Some examples of this can be seen in: (1) the softer tone used by women in speech; (2) a married woman introducing herself as someone's mother or wife, not with her own name; (3) the presence of gender differences in titles and occupational terms (for example, a sajang is a company president, and yŏsajang is a female company president); (4) females sometimes using more tag questions and rising tones in statements, also seen in speech from children.

Between two people of asymmetric status in Korean society, people tend to emphasize differences in status for the sake of solidarity. Koreans prefer to use kinship terms, rather than any other terms of reference. In traditional Korean society, women have long been in disadvantaged positions. Korean social structure traditionally was a patriarchically dominated family system that emphasized the maintenance of family lines. That structure has tended to separate the roles of women from those of men.

Cho and Whitman (2019) explain that the different categories like male and female in social conditions influence Korean's features. What they noticed was the word jagi (자기). Before explaining the word jagi, one thing that needs to be clearly distinguished is that jagi can be used in a variety of situations, not all of which mean the same thing, but they depend on the context. Parallel variable solidarity and affection move the convention of speech style, especially terms of address that Jagi (자기 'you') has emerged as a gender-specific second-person pronoun used by women. However, young Koreans use the word jagi to their lovers or spouses regardless of gender. Among middle-aged women, the word jagi is sometimes used to call someone who is close to them.

Korean society's prevalent attitude towards men being in public (outside the home) and women living in private still exists today. For instance, the word for husband is bakkat-yangban (바깥양반 'outside' 'nobleman'), but a husband introduces his wife as an|saram (안사람 an 'inside' 'person'). Also in kinship terminology, we (외 'outside' or 'wrong') is added for maternal grandparents, creating oe-harabeoji and oe-hal-meoni (외할아버지, 외할머니 'grandfather and grandmother'), with different lexicons for males and females and patriarchal society revealed. Further, in interrogatives to an addressee of equal or lower status, Korean men tend to use haennya (했냐? 'did it?’)' in aggressive masculinity, but women use haenni (했니? 'did it?’)' as a soft expression. However, there are exceptions. Korean society used the question endings -ni (니) and -nya (냐), the former prevailing among women and men until a few decades ago. In fact, -nya (냐) was characteristic of the Jeolla and Chungcheong dialects. However, since the 1950s, large numbers of people have moved to Seoul from Chungcheong and Jeolla, and they began to influence the way men speak. Recently, women also have used the -nya (냐). As for -ni (니), it is usually used toward people to be polite even to someone not close or younger. As for -nya (냐), it is used mainly to close friends regardless of gender.

Like the case of "actor" and "actress," it also is possible to add a gender prefix for emphasis: biseo (비서 'secretary') is sometimes is combined with yeo (여 'female') to form yeo-biseo (여비서 'female secretary'); namja (남자 'man') often is added to ganhosa (간호사 'nurse') to form namja-ganhosa (남자간호사 'male nurse'). That is not about omission; it is about addition. Words without those prefixes neither sound awkward nor remind listeners of political correctness.

Another crucial difference between men and women is the tone and pitch of their voices and how they affect the perception of politeness. Men learn to use an authoritative falling tone; in Korean culture, a deeper voice is associated with being more polite. In addition to the deferential speech endings being used, men are seen as more polite as well as impartial, and professional. Compared to women who use a rising tone in conjunction with -yo (요), they are not perceived to be as polite as men. The -yo (요) also indicates uncertainty since the ending has many prefixes that indicate uncertainty and questioning. The deferential ending does not have any prefixes and do can indicate uncertainty. The -hamnida (합니다) ending is the most polite and formal form of Korea, and the -yo (요) ending is less polite and formal, which causes the perception of women as less professional.

Hedges soften an assertion, and their function as a euphemism in women's speech in terms of discourse difference. Women are expected to add nasal sounds neyng, neym, ney-e, more frequently than men do in the last syllable. Often, l is often added in women's for female stereotypes and so igeolo (이거로 'this thing') becomes igeollo (이걸로 'this thing') to refer to a lack of confidence and passive construction.

Women use more linguistic markers such as exclamation eomeo (어머 'oh') and eojjeom (어쩜 'what a surprise') than men do in cooperative communication.

Vocabulary
The core of the Korean vocabulary is made up of native Korean words. However, a significant proportion of the vocabulary, especially words that denote abstract ideas, are Sino-Korean words (of Chinese origin). To a much lesser extent, some words have also been borrowed from Mongolian and other languages. More recent loanwords are dominated by English.

North Korean vocabulary shows a tendency to prefer native Korean over Sino-Korean or foreign borrowings, especially with recent political objectives aimed at eliminating foreign influences on the Korean language in the North. In the early years, the North Korean government tried to eliminate Sino-Korean words. Consequently, South Korean may have several Sino-Korean or foreign borrowings which are not in North Korean.

Sino-Korean 

Sino-Korean vocabulary consists of:
 words directly borrowed from written Chinese, and
 compounds coined in Korea or Japan and read using the Sino-Korean reading of Chinese characters.

Therefore, just like other words, Korean has two sets of numeral systems. English is similar, having native English words and Latinate equivalents such as water-aqua, fire-flame, sea-marine, two-dual, sun-solar, star-stellar. However, unlike English and Latin which belong to the same Indo-European languages family and bear a certain resemblance, Korean and Chinese are genetically unrelated and the two sets of Korean words differ completely from each other. All Sino-Korean morphemes are monosyllabic as in Chinese, whereas native Korean morphemes can be polysyllabic. The Sino-Korean words were deliberately imported alongside corresponding Chinese characters for a written language and everything was supposed to be written in Hanja, so the coexistence of Sino-Korean would be more thorough and systematic than that of Latinate words in English.

The exact proportion of Sino-Korean vocabulary is a matter of debate. Sohn (2001) stated 50–60%. In 2006 the same author gives an even higher estimate of 65%. Jeong Jae-do, one of the compilers of the dictionary Urimal Keun Sajeon, asserts that the proportion is not so high. He points out that Korean dictionaries compiled during the colonial period include many unused Sino-Korean words. In his estimation, the proportion of Sino-Korean vocabulary in the Korean language might be as low as 30%.

Western loanwords 

The vast majority of loanwords other than Sino-Korean come from modern times, approximately 90% of which are from English. Many words have also been borrowed from Western languages such as German via Japanese ( (areubaiteu) "part-time job",  (allereugi) "allergy",  (gibseu or gibuseu) "plaster cast used for broken bones"). Some Western words were borrowed indirectly via Japanese during the Japanese occupation of Korea, taking a Japanese sound pattern, for example "dozen" >  dāsu >  daseu. Most indirect Western borrowings are now written according to current "Hangulization" rules for the respective Western language, as if borrowed directly. There are a few more complicated borrowings such as "German(y)" (see names of Germany), the first part of whose endonym Deutschland  the Japanese approximated using the kanji   doitsu that were then accepted into the Korean language by their Sino-Korean pronunciation:  dok +  il = Dogil. In South Korean official use, a number of other Sino-Korean country names have been replaced with phonetically oriented "Hangeulizations" of the countries' endonyms or English names.

Because of such a prevalence of English in modern South Korean culture and society, lexical borrowing is inevitable. English-derived Korean, or "Konglish", is increasingly used. The vocabulary of the South Korean dialect of the Korean language is roughly 5% loanwords (excluding Sino-Korean vocabulary). However, due to North Korea's isolation, such influence is lacking in North Korean speech.

Korean uses words adapted from English in ways that may seem strange or unintuitive to native English speakers. For example, fighting ( hwaiting / paiting) is a term of encouragement, like 'come on'/'go (on)' in English. Something that is 'service' ( seobiseu) is free or 'on the house'. A building referred to as an 'apart' ( apateu) is an 'apartment' (but in fact refers to a residence more akin to a condominium) and a type of pencil that is called a 'sharp' is a mechanical pencil. Like other borrowings, many of these idiosyncrasies, including all the examples listed above, appear to be imported into Korean via Japanese, or influenced by Japanese. Many English words introduced via Japanese pronunciation have been reformed, as in 멜론 (melon) which was once called 메론 (meron) as in Japanese.

Writing system

Before the creation of the modern Korean alphabet, known as Chosŏn'gŭl in North Korea and as Hangul in South Korea, people in Korea (known as Joseon at the time) primarily wrote using Classical Chinese alongside native phonetic writing systems that predate Hangul by hundreds of years, including idu, hyangchal, gugyeol, and gakpil. However, the fundamental differences between the Korean and Chinese languages and the large number of characters to be learned made few people in the lower classes have the privilege of education, and they had much difficulty in learning how to write using Chinese characters. To assuage that problem, King Sejong created the unique alphabet known as Hangul to promote literacy among the common people.

The Korean alphabet was denounced and looked down upon by the yangban aristocracy, who deemed it too easy to learn, but it gained widespread use among the common class and was widely used to print popular novels which were enjoyed by the common class. With growing Korean nationalism in the 19th century, the Gabo Reformists' push, and the promotion of Hangul in schools, in 1894, Hangul displaced Hanja as Korea's national script. Hanja are still used to a certain extent in South Korea, where they are sometimes combined with Hangul, but that method is slowly declining in use even though students learn Hanja in school.

Symbol chart 
Below is a chart of the Korean alphabet's (Hangul) symbols and their Revised Romanization (RR) and canonical International Phonetic Alphabet (IPA) values:

The letters of the Korean alphabet are not written linearly like most alphabets, but instead arranged into blocks that represent syllables. So, while the word bibimbap (Korean rice dish) is written as eight characters in a row in the Latin alphabet, in Korean it is written 비빔밥, as three "syllabic blocks" in a row. Mukbang ( 'eating show') is seven characters after romanization but only two "syllabic blocks" before.

Modern Korean is written with spaces between words, a feature not found in Chinese or Japanese (except when Japanese is written exclusively in hiragana, as in children's books). The marks used for Korean punctuation are almost identical to Western ones. Traditionally, Korean was written in columns, from top to bottom, right to left, like traditional Chinese. However, the syllabic blocks are now usually written in rows, from left to right, top to bottom, like English.

Dialects

Korean has numerous small local dialects (called mal [literally 'speech'], saturi, or bang'eon. The standard language (pyojun-eo or pyojun-mal) of both South Korea and North Korea is based on the dialect of the area around Seoul (which, as Hanyang, was the capital of Joseon-era Korea for 500 years), though the northern standard after the Korean War has been influenced by the dialect of P'yŏngyang. All dialects of Korean are similar to each other and largely mutually intelligible (with the exception of dialect-specific phrases or non-Standard vocabulary unique to dialects), though the dialect of Jeju Island is divergent enough to be sometimes classified as a separate language. One of the more salient differences between dialects is the use of tone: speakers of the Seoul dialect make use of vowel length, whereas speakers of the Gyeongsang dialect maintain the pitch accent of Middle Korean. Some dialects are conservative, maintaining Middle Korean sounds (such as z, β, ə) which have been lost from the standard language, whereas others are highly innovative.

Kang Yoon-jung et al. (2013), Kim Mi-ryoung (2013), and Cho Sung-hye (2017) suggest that the modern Seoul dialect is currently undergoing tonogenesis, based on the finding that in recent years lenis consonants (ㅂㅈㄷㄱ), aspirated consonants (ㅍㅊㅌㅋ) and fortis consonants (ㅃㅉㄸㄲ) were shifting from a distinction via voice onset time to that of pitch change; however, Choi Ji-youn et al. (2020) disagree with the suggestion that the consonant distinction shifting away from voice onset time is due to the introduction of tonal features, and instead proposes that it is a prosodically conditioned change.

There is substantial evidence for a history of extensive dialect levelling, or even convergent evolution or intermixture of two or more originally distinct linguistic stocks, within the Korean language and its dialects. This suggests that the Korean Peninsula may have at one time been much more linguistically diverse than it is at present. See also the Japanese–Koguryoic languages hypothesis.

Nonetheless, the separation of the two Korean states has resulted in increasing differences among the dialects that have emerged over time. Since the allies of the newly founded nations split the Korean peninsula in half after 1945, the newly formed Korean nations have since borrowed vocabulary extensively from their respective allies. As the Soviet Union helped industrialize North Korea and establish it as a communist state, the North Koreans therefore borrowed a number of Russian terms. Likewise, since the United States helped South Korea extensively to develop militarily, economically, and politically, South Koreans therefore borrowed extensively from English.

The differences among northern and southern dialects have become so significant that many North Korean defectors reportedly have had great difficulty communicating with South Koreans after having initially settled into South Korea. In response to the diverging vocabularies, an app called Univoca was designed to help North Korean defectors learn South Korean terms by translating them into North Korean ones. More information can be found on the page North-South differences in the Korean language.

Aside from the standard language, there are few clear boundaries between Korean dialects, and they are typically partially grouped according to the regions of Korea.

Recently, both North and South Korea's usage rate of the regional dialect have been decreasing due to social factors. In North Korea, the central government is urging its citizens to use Munhwaŏ (the standard language of North Korea), to deter the usage of foreign language and Chinese characters: Kim Jong-un said in a speech "if your language in life is cultural and polite, you can achieve harmony and comradely unity among people." In South Korea, due to relocation in the population to Seoul to find jobs and the usage of standard language in education and media, the prevalence of regional dialects has decreased. Moreover, internationally, due to the increasing popularity of K-pop, the Seoul standard language has become more widely taught and used.

{| class="wikitable"
|-
! Standard language

! Locations of use
|-
| Pyojuneo
| Standard language of ROK. Based on Seoul dialect; very similar to Incheon and most of Gyeonggi, west of Gangwon-do (Yeongseo region); also commonly used among younger Koreans nationwide and in online context.
|-
| Munhwaŏ
| Standard language of DPRK. Based on Seoul dialect and P'yŏngan dialect.
|-
! Regional dialects
! Locations of use and example compared to the standard language 
|-There are few clear boundaries between Korean dialects, and
| Hamgyŏng/Northeastern(/)
| Rasŏn, most of Hamgyŏng region, northeast P'yŏngan, Ryanggang Province (North Korea), Jilin (China).
 The Hamgyŏng dialect is a dialect with tones like the Yeongdong dialect and the Gyeongsang dialect.
 It is also the most spoken dialect by North Korean defectors in South Korea, as about 80% of them are from Hamgyŏng Province.
 Koryo-Mal, the moribund variety of Korean spoken mainly by elderly  in Central Asia and Russia, is descended from the Northern Hamgyong Dialect, as well as the Yukchin Dialect.
 Honorific

 Ordinary way of speaking
 The vowel 'ㅔ(e)' is changed to 'ㅓ(eo)'.
 example: "Your daughter has come."

 When calling a superior person, always put the ending '요(yo)' after the noun.
 example: "Grandpa, come quickly."

 The ending '-니까(-nikka)' is changed to '-길래(-gilrae)'.
 example: "Come early because you have to cultivate the field."

|-
| P'yŏngan/Northwestern(/)
| P'yŏngan region, P'yŏngyang, Chagang, northern North Hamgyŏng (North Korea), Liaoning (China)
 The Pyongan dialect, along with the Gyeonggi dialect, is also a dialect that greatly influenced the formation of Munhwaŏ.
 It is also the North Korean dialect best known to South Koreans.
 Honorific

 Ordinary way of speaking
 The vowel 'ㅕ(yeo)' is changed to'ㅔ(e)'.
 example: armpit

 When '이(i)', '야(ya)', '여(yeo)', '요(yo)', '유(yu)', '에(e)' appear at the beginning, the consonant is changed to 'ㄴ(n)'.
 example: 1) Summer 2) Seven 3) Trend

 When representing the past, there is a dropout phenomenon of 'ㅆ(ss/tt)'.
 example: "I brought this."

|-
| Hwanghae/Central(/)
| Hwanghae region (North Korea). Also in the Islands of Yeonpyeongdo, Baengnyeongdo and Daecheongdo in Ongjin County of Incheon.
 Hwanghae dialect was originally more similar to the Gyeonggi dialect, but as the division between North and South Korea prolonged, it is now heavily influenced by the Pyongan dialect.
 It is also the least existential dialect of all Korean dialects, and there has been little study regarding the dialect.
 Due to a high amount of Korean war refugees, areas such as Incheon close to Hwanghae, have large populations of people originally from Hwanghae. Thus, certain phrases and words from the dialect can seldom be heard among older residents of such cities.
 Honorific

 Ordinary way of speaking
 Many of the vowels are pronounced as 'ㅣ(i)'.
 example: habit

 '네(ne)' is used as a questionable form.
 example: "Did you eat?"

 '-누만(-numan)' is often used as an exclamation sentence.
 example: "It got a lot colder"

Areas in Northwest Hwanghae, such as Ongjin County in Hwanghae Province, pronounced 'ㅈ' (j), originally pronounced the letter more closely to tz. However, this has largely disappeared.
The rest is almost similar to the Gyeonggi and Pyongan dialect.
|-
| Gyeonggi/Central(/)
| Seoul, Incheon, Gyeonggi region (South Korea), as well as Kaeseong, Gaepoong and Changpung in North Korea.
Seoul dialect, which was the basis of Pyojuneo, is a subdialect of Gyeonggi dialect.
About 70% of all Seoul dialect vocabulary has been adopted as Pyojuneo, and only about 10% out of 30% of Seoul dialect vocabulary that has not been adopted in Pyojuneo have been used so far.
Gyeonggi dialect is the least existential dialect in South Korea, and most people do not know that Gyeonggi dialect itself exists. So, Gyeonggi-do residents say they only use standard language, and many people know the language spoken by Gyeonggi-do residents as standard language in other regions.
Recently, young people have come to realize that there is a dialect in Seoul as they are exposed to the Seoul dialect through media such as YouTube.
Among the Gyeonggi dialects, the best known dialect along with Seoul dialect is Suwon dialect. The dialects of Suwon and its surrounding areas are quite different from those of northern Gyeonggi Province and surrounding areas of Seoul.
In some areas of the southern part of Gyeonggi Province, which is close to Chungcheong Province, such as Pyeongtaek and Anseong, it is also included in the Chungcheong dialect area. Local residents living in these areas also admit that they speak Chungcheong dialect.
Traditionally, coastal areas of Gyeonggi, particularly Incheon, Ganghwa, Ongjin and Gimpo have been recorded to have some influence from the dialects of Hwanghae and Chungcheong, due to historic intermixing with the two regions, as well as geographical proximity. This old influence, however, has largely died out among most middle aged and younger locals from the region.
Originally, northern Gyeonggi Province, including Seoul, received influence from Northern dialects (Areas of Kaeseong along the Ryesong River, or Ganghwa Island, received an especially high amount of influence from the Hwanghae dialect), while southern Gyeonggi Province was influenced from Chungcheong dialect. However, as a result of the prolonged division and the large number of migrants from Chungcheong Province and Jeolla Province to Seoul, the current way of speaking in Gyeonggi has been greatly influenced by Chungcheong and Jeolla.

 Honorific

Ordinary way of speaking
 The vowel 'ㅏ(a)' is changed to 'ㅓ(eo)', and 'ㅓ(eo)' is changed to 'ㅡ(eu)'.
 example: 1) "It hurts." 2) "It's dirty"

 The vowel 'ㅏ(a)' and 'ㅓ(eo)' are sometimes changed to 'ㅐ(ae)'.
 example: 1) Sesame oil 2) "You look like a fool."

 The vowel 'ㅗ(o)' is mainly changed to 'ㅜ(u)'.
 example: 1) "What are you doing?" 2) uncle

Dialects of Suwon and its surrounding areas.
 The ending '~거야(geoya)' ends briefly with '~거(geo)'
 example: "Where will you go?"

|-
| Gangwon<Yeongseo/Yeongdong>/Central(/)
| Yeongseo (Gangwon (South Korea)/Kangwŏn (North Korea) west of the Taebaek Mountains), Yeongdong (Gangwon (South Korea)/Kangwŏn (North Korea), east of the Taebaek Mountains)
Gangwon Province is divided between Yeongseo and Yeongdong due to the Taebaek Mountains, so even if it is the same Gangwon Province, there is a significant difference in dialect between the two regions.
In the case of the Yeongseo dialect, the accent is slightly different from the dialect of Gyeonggi Province, but most of the vocabulary is similar to the dialect of Gyeonggi Province.
Unlike the Yeongseo dialect, Yeongdong dialect has a tone, such as Hamgyeong dialect and Gyeongsang dialect.
Gangwon dialect is the least spoken dialect of all dialects in South Korea except Jeju.
 Honorific

Ordinary way of speaking
 There are pronunciations, such as 'ㆉ(yoi)' and 'ㆌ(yui)', that you cannot hear in most regions of Korea.
 The vowel 'ㅠ(yu)' is changed to 'ㅟ(wi)' or 'ㆌ(yui)'.
 example: Vacation

 Use '나(na)' a lot in questionable form.
 example: "What are you doing lately?"

|-
| Chungcheong/Central(/)
| Daejeon, Sejong, Chungcheong region (South Korea)
Chungcheong dialect is considered to be the softest dialect to hear among all dialects of Korean.
Chungcheong dialect is one of the most recognized dialects in South Korea, along with Jeolla dialect and Gyeongsang dialect.
Chungcheong dialect was the most commonly used dialect by aristocrats(Yangban) during the Joseon Dynasty, along with dialects in northern Gyeongsang Province.
In the case of Chungcheong dialect, it is a dialect belonging to the central dialect along with Gyeonggi, Gangwon, and Hwanghae dialects, but some scholars view it as a separate dialect separated from the central dialect. In addition, some scholars classify southern Chungcheong dialect regions such as Daejeon, Sejong, and Gongju as the southern dialect such as Jeolla and Gyeongsang dialects.
 Honorific

Ordinary way of speaking
 The vowel 'ㅑ(ya)' that comes to the ending is changed to 'ㅕ(yeo)'.
 example: 1) "What are you talking about?" 2) "What are you doing?"

 'ㅔ(e)' is mainly changed to 'ㅣ(i)', and 'ㅐ(ae)' is mainly changed to 'ㅑ(ya)' or 'ㅕ(yeo)'.
 example: 1) "He/She/They said he/she/they put it outside." 2) "Would you like to eat this?" 3) "Okay." 

 The ending '겠(gett)' is mainly pronounced as '겄(geott)', and the ending'까(kka)' is mainly pronounced as '께(kke)'.
 example: "I've put it all away, so it'll be okay."

The rest is almost similar to the Gyeonggi dialect.
|-
| Jeolla/Southwestern(/)
| Gwangju, Jeolla region (South Korea)
Jeolla dialect is a dialect that feels rough along with Gyeongsang dialect. Especially it is well known for its swearing.
Jeolla dialect speakers, along with Gyeongsang dialect speakers, have high self-esteem in their local dialects.
Many Jeolla dialect speakers can be found not only in Jeolla Province but also in Seoul and Gyeonggi Province, because Jeolla Province itself was alienated from development, so many Jeolla residents came to Seoul and Gyeonggi Province.
Much of Northern Jeolla, especially in areas close to Southern Chungcheong like Jeonju, Gunsan and Wanju have traditionally had weaker accents compared to the south, and in some cases, might be more closer to the Chungcheong dialect in terms of vocabulary and intonation.
 Honorific

Ordinary way of speaking
 The vowel 'ㅢ(ui)' is pronounced as 'ㅡ(eu)'.
 example: Doctor

 The ending '지(ji)' is pronounced as '제(je)'.
 example: "That's right."

 Use a lot of '잉(ing)' at the end of words.
 example: "It's really pretty."

Famously, natives of Southern Jeolla pronounce certain combinations of vowels in Korean more softly, or omit the latter vowel entirely.

However, in the case of '모대(modae)', it is also observed in South Chungcheong Province and some areas of southern Gyeonggi Province close to South Chungcheong Province.

The rest is almost similar to the Chungcheong dialect.
|-
| Gyeongsang/Southeastern(/)
| Busan, Daegu, Ulsan, Gyeongsang region (South Korea)
Gyeongsang dialect is the best known dialect of all South Korean dialects. This is known not only by Koreans but also by foreigners interested in Korean culture.
Gyeongsang dialect is also known as the most rough and macho-like dialect of all South Korean dialects.
Gyeongsang dialect has a tone like Hamgyeong dialect and Yeongdong dialect.
Gyeongsang dialect is the most common dialect in dramas among all Korean dialects except for Gyeonggi dialect.
 Honorific

Ordinary way of speaking
 In question, '노(no)' and '나(na)' are mainly used. Use '나(na)' when asking for a short answer, and '노(no)' when asking for a specific answer.
 example: 1) "Have you eaten?" 2) "What did you eat?"

 When talking, the sentence often ends with '~다 아이가(~da aiga)'.
 example: "You said so."

 '~하다(~hada)' is pronounced as '~카다(~kada)'.
 example: "Why are you doing that?"

The rest is almost similar to the Jeolla dialect.
|-
|Jeju*
| Jeju Island/Province (South Korea); sometimes classified as a separate language in the Koreanic language family
example: Hangul
Pyojuneo:  (Hangul)
Jeju:  (Hongul)

 Honorific

|-
|}

 North–South differences 

The language used in the North and the South exhibit differences in pronunciation, spelling, grammar and vocabulary.

Pronunciation

Words that are written the same way may be pronounced differently (such as the examples below). The pronunciations below are given in Revised Romanization, McCune–Reischauer and modified Hangul (what the Korean characters would be if one were to write the word as pronounced).

* In the South, this rule only applies when it is attached to any single-character Sino-Korean word.

Spelling

Some words are spelled differently by the North and the South, but the pronunciations are the same.

Spelling and pronunciation
Some words have different spellings and pronunciations in the North and the South. Most of the official languages of North Korea are from the northwest (Pyeongan dialect), and the standard language of South Korea is the standard language (Seoul language close to Gyeonggi dialect). some of which were given in the "Phonology" section above:

{| class="wikitable"
|-
! colspan="4" |Word
! rowspan="2" |Meaning
! rowspan="2" |Remarks
|-
! North spelling
! North pronun.
! South spelling
! South pronun.
|-
| 
| ryeongryang (ryŏngryang)
| 
| yeongnyang (yŏngnyang)
| strength
| Initial r'''s are dropped if followed by i or y in the South Korean version of Korean.
|-
| 
| rodong (rodong)
| 
| nodong (nodong)
| work
| Initial rs are demoted to an n if not followed by i or y in the South Korean version of Korean.
|-
| 
| wonssu (wŏnssu)
| 
| wonsu (wŏnsu)
| mortal enemy
| "Mortal enemy" and "field marshal" are homophones in the South. Possibly to avoid referring to Kim Il-sung, Kim Jong-il or Kim Jong-un as the enemy, the second syllable of "enemy" is written and pronounced  in the North.
|-
| 
| rajio (rajio)
| 
| radio (radio)
| radio
|
|-
| 
| u (u)
| 
| wi (wi)
| on; above
|
|-
| 
| anhae (anhae)
| 
| anae (anae)
| wife
|
|-
| 
| kkuba (kkuba)
| 
| kuba (k'uba)
| Cuba
| When transcribing foreign words from languages that do not have contrasts between aspirated and unaspirated stops, North Koreans generally use tensed stops for the unaspirated ones while South Koreans use aspirated stops in both cases.
|-
|
|pe (p'e)
|
|pye (p'ye), pe (p'e)
|lungs
|In the case where ye comes after a consonant, such as in hye and pye, it is pronounced without the palatal approximate. North Korean orthography reflects this pronunciation nuance.
|}

In general, when transcribing place names, North Korea tends to use the pronunciation in the original language more than South Korea, which often uses the pronunciation in English. For example:

Grammar
Some grammatical constructions are also different:

Punctuation

Vocabulary
Some vocabulary is different between the North and the South:

Geographic distribution

Korean is spoken by the Korean people in both South Korea and North Korea, and by the Korean diaspora in many countries including the People's Republic of China, the United States, Japan, and Russia. Currently, Korean is the fourth most popular foreign language in China, following English, Japanese, and Russian. Korean-speaking minorities exist in these states, but because of cultural assimilation into host countries, not all ethnic Koreans may speak it with native fluency.

Official status
Korean is the official language of South Korea and North Korea. It, along with Mandarin Chinese, is also one of the two official languages of China's Yanbian Korean Autonomous Prefecture.

In North Korea, the regulatory body is the Language Institute of the Academy of Social Sciences (Sahoe Gwahagweon Eohag Yeonguso). In South Korea, the regulatory body for Korean is the Seoul-based National Institute of the Korean Language, which was created by presidential decree on 23 January 1991.

King Sejong Institute
Established pursuant to Article 9, Section 2, of the Framework Act on the National Language, the King Sejong Institute is a public institution set up to coordinate the government's project of propagating Korean language and culture; it also supports the King Sejong Institute, which is the institution's overseas branch. The King Sejong Institute was established in response to:

 An increase in the demand for Korean language education;
 a rapid increase in Korean language education thanks to the spread of the culture (hallyu), an increase in international marriage, the expansion of Korean enterprises into overseas markets, and enforcement of employment licensing system;
 the need for a government-sanctioned Korean language educational institution;
 the need for general support for overseas Korean language education based on a successful domestic language education program.

 TOPIK Korea Institute 
The TOPIK Korea Institute is a lifelong educational center affiliated with a variety of Korean universities in Seoul, South Korea, whose aim is to promote Korean language and culture, support local Korean teaching internationally, and facilitate cultural exchanges.

The institute is sometimes compared to language and culture promotion organizations such as the King Sejong Institute. Unlike that organization, however, the TOPIK Korea Institute operates within established universities and colleges around the world, providing educational materials. In countries around the world, Korean embassies and cultural centers (한국문화원) administer TOPIK examinations.

Foreign language
For native English-speakers, Korean is generally considered to be one of the most difficult foreign languages to master despite the relative ease of learning Hangul. For instance, the United States' Defense Language Institute places Korean in Category IV with Japanese, Chinese (Mandarin and Cantonese), and Arabic, requiring 64 weeks of instruction (as compared to just 26 weeks for Category I languages like Italian, French,  and Spanish)  to bring an English-speaking student to a limited working level of proficiency in which they have "sufficient capability to meet routine social demands and limited job requirements" and "can deal with concrete topics in past, present, and future tense." Similarly, the Foreign Service Institute's School of Language Studies places Korean in Category IV, the highest level of difficulty.

The study of the Korean language in the United States is dominated by Korean American heritage language students, who in 2007 were estimated to form over 80% of all students of the language at non-military universities. However, Sejong Institutes in the United States have noted a sharp rise in the number of people of other ethnic backgrounds studying Korean between 2009 and 2011, which they attribute to rising popularity of South Korean music and television shows. In 2018, it was reported that the rise in K-Pop was responsible for the increase in people learning the language in US universities.

 Testing 
There are two widely used tests of Korean as a foreign language: the Korean Language Proficiency Test (KLPT) and the Test of Proficiency in Korean (TOPIK). The Korean Language Proficiency Test, an examination aimed at assessing non-native speakers' competence in Korean, was instituted in 1997; 17,000 people applied for the 2005 sitting of the examination. The TOPIK was first administered in 1997 and was taken by 2,274 people. Since then the total number of people who have taken the TOPIK has surpassed 1 million, with more than 150,000 candidates taking the test in 2012. TOPIK is administered in 45 regions within South Korea and 72 nations outside of South Korea, with a significant portion being administered in Japan and North America, which would suggest the targeted audience for TOPIK is still primarily foreigners of Korean heritage. This is also evident in TOPIK's website, where the examination is introduced as intended for Korean heritage students.

See also

 Outline of Korean language
 Korean count word
 Korean Cultural Center (KCC)
 Korean dialects
 Korean language and computers
 Korean mixed script
 Korean particles
 Korean proverbs
 Korean sign language
 Korean romanization
 McCune–Reischauer
 Revised romanization of Korean
 SKATS
 Yale romanization of Korean
 List of English words of Korean origin
 Vowel harmony
 History of Korean
 Korean films
 Cinema of North Korea
 Cinema of South Korea

 Notes 

References

 Further reading 
 
 
 
 
 
  (Volume 4 of the London Oriental and African Language Library'').
 
 
 
 
 
 
 
 
 
 
 
  In 3 volumes.
 
 
 
 
 
  Unpublished Harvard University PhD dissertation.

External links
 Linguistic and Philosophical Origins of the Korean Alphabet (Hangul)
 Sogang University free online Korean language and culture course
 Beginner's guide to Korean for English speakers
 U.S. Foreign Service Institute Korean basic course
 asianreadings.com, Korean readings with hover prompts
 Linguistic map of Korea
 dongsa.net, Korean verb conjugation tool
 Hanja Explorer, a tool to visualize and study Korean vocabulary
 

 
Agglutinative languages
Languages attested from the 4th century
Language isolates of Asia
Languages of Korea
Languages of North Korea
Languages of South Korea
National symbols of Korea
Subject–object–verb languages